is a railway station on the Ōu Main Line in the city of Yuzawa, Akita Prefecture,  Japan, operated by JR East.

Lines
Yuzawa Station is served by the Ōu Main Line, and is located 210.4 km from the terminus of the line at Fukushima Station.

Station layout
The station consists of one side platform and one island platform connected to the station building by a footbridge. The station is attended and has a Midori no Madoguchi staffed ticket office.

Platforms

History
Yuzawa Station opened on July 5, 1905 as a station on the Japanese Government Railways (JGR) Ōu South Line. The Ogachi Railway began operations on August 10, 1928 and was renamed the Dewa Railroad on May 1, 1944. The JGR became the Japan National Railways (JNR) after World War II. The Dewa Railway ceased operations from April 1, 1977. The station was absorbed into the JR East network upon the privatization of the JNR on April 1, 1987.

Passenger statistics
In fiscal 2018, the station was used by an average of 631 passengers daily (boarding passengers only).

Surrounding area

 FM Yutopia

See also
List of railway stations in Japan

References

External links

 JR East Station information 

Railway stations in Japan opened in 1905
Railway stations in Akita Prefecture
Ōu Main Line
Yuzawa, Akita